The bilateral relations between Germany and the United Kingdom span hundreds of years, and the countries have been aligned since the end of World War II.

Relations were very strong in the Late Middle Ages when the German cities of the Hanseatic League traded with England and Scotland.

Before the Unification of Germany in 1871, Britain was often allied in wartime with its dominant Prussia. The royal families often intermarried. The House of Hanover (1714–1837) ruled the small Electorate of Hanover, later the Kingdom of Hanover, as well as Britain.

Historians have long focused on the diplomatic and naval rivalries between Germany and Britain after 1871 to search for the root causes of the growing antagonism that led to World War I. In recent years, historians have paid greater attention to the mutual cultural, ideological and technological influences.

During the Napoleonic Wars (1803–1815), Prussia was from some time a British ally and suffered for it; some of the other German states had supported France.

Germany, as the German Empire, fought against the United Kingdom and its allies in World War I between 1914 and 1918. Germany, as Nazi Germany, again fought the United Kingdom and allied forces in World War II between 1939 and 1945. Germany was defeated by the United Kingdom and its allies in both wars. Following the defeat of Nazi Germany, Germany was occupied by the allied forces, including the United Kingdom, from 1945 to 1955. Following this, the country was divided into West Germany and East Germany. The United Kingdom became close allies with West Germany during the Cold War, through West Germany's integration into the 'Western world'. For example, through the United States-led defence partnership, NATO, as Britain said that a Soviet incursion into Germany or a nuclear strike would be met with British fire, or nuclear retalliation.  Contrastingly, relations between East Germany and the United Kingdom were poor due to East Germany being allied to the Soviet Union during the Cold War.

West Germany was a founding member of the European Communities, later to become the European Union, which the United Kingdom joined in 1973. West Germany and the United Kingdom were some of the most powerful countries in the organisation, both having significant influence on its development. Germany broadly favoured European integration, whereas the United Kingdom generally opposed it.

East and West Germany reunified following the fall of the Berlin Wall in 1989 which marked the end of the Cold War, which led to East Germany sharing the superior relationship with the United Kingdom which it had developed with West Germany.

Through membership of the European Union, trade and cooperation with the United Kingdom significantly increased in many areas, particularly in research and development which has created enduring links between the science and university communities of Germany and the United Kingdom. The United Kingdom is the second largest consumer of German motor vehicles after Germany itself.

In a referendum on continued membership of the European Union in 2016, the United Kingdom voted to withdraw from the European Union and left the bloc on 31 January 2020 after 47 years of membership. Despite a slight reduction in trade afterwards, relations still remain strong in many areas. Their joint response to the current war in Ukraine has reinforced this.

UK Government data reports 126,000 German nationals were living in the United Kingdom in 2013 and German Government data reports 107,000 British nationals living in Germany in 2016.

Historical connections

Shared heritage
English and German are both West Germanic languages. Modern English has diverged significantly after absorbing more French influence after 1066. English has its roots in the languages spoken by Germanic peoples from mainland Europe, more specifically various peoples came from what is now the Netherlands, Germany and Denmark, including a people called the Angles after whom the English are named. Many everyday words in English are of Germanic origin and are similar to their German counterparts, and more intellectual and formal words are of French, Latin or Greek origin, but German tends to form calques of many of these. English has become a dominant world language and is widely studied in Germany. German, in the 19th and the early 20th centuries, was an important language of science and technology, but it has now largely lost that role. In English schools, German was a niche language and much less important than French. German is no longer widely studied in Britain, except at the A-level in secondary schools.

Trade and Hanseatic League
There is a long history of trade relations between the Germans and the British. The Hanseatic League was a commercial and defensive confederation of merchant guilds, and its market towns dominated trade along the coast of Northern Europe. It stretched from the Baltic to the North Sea in the 13th to the 17th centuries, and it included London. The main centre was Lübeck.  The League facilitated trade between London and its numerous cities, most of them controlled by German merchants. It also opened up trade with the Baltic.

Royal family 
Until the late 17th century, marriages between the English and German royal families were uncommon. Empress Matilda, the daughter of Henry I of England, was married between 1114 and 1125 to Henry V, Holy Roman Emperor, but they had no issue. In 1256, Richard, 1st Earl of Cornwall, was elected King of Germany, and his sons were surnamed Almain. Throughout this period, the steelyard of London was a typical German business settlement. German mercenaries were hired in the Wars of the Roses.

Anne of Cleves was the consort of Henry VIII, but it was not until William III of England that a king of German origin came to reign, from the House of Nassau. The consort of his successor, Queen Anne was Prince George of Denmark, from the House of Oldenburg, who had no surviving children.

In 1714, George I, a German-speaking Hanoverian prince of mixed British and German descent, ascended to the British throne, founding the House of Hanover. For over a century, Britain's monarchs were also rulers of Hanover (first as Prince Electors of the Holy Roman Empire and then as Kings of Hanover). There was only a personal union, and both countries remained quite separate, but the king lived in London. British leaders often complained that Kings George I, who barely spoke any English, and George II were heavily involved in Hanover and distorted British foreign policy for the benefit of Hanover, a small, poor, rural and unimportant country in Western Europe. In contrast, King George III never visited Hanover in the 60 years (1760–1820) that he ruled it. Hanover was occupied by France during the Napoleonic Wars, but some Hanoverian troops fled to England to form the King's German Legion, an ethnic German unit in the British army. The personal link with Hanover finally ended in 1837, with the accession of Queen Victoria to the British throne, while obtaining Heligoland from Denmark. The semi-Salic law prevented her from being on the throne of Hanover since a male relative was available.

Every British monarch from George I to George V in the 20th century took a German consort. Queen Victoria was raised under close supervision by her German-born mother, Princess Victoria of Saxe-Coburg-Saalfeld and married her first cousin Prince Albert of Saxe-Coburg and Gotha in 1840. Their daughter, Princess Victoria, married Prince Friedrich Wilhelm of Prussia in 1858, who became Crown Prince three years later. Both were liberals, admired Britain and detested German Chancellor Otto von Bismarck, but Bismarck had the ear of the elderly German Emperor Wilhelm I, who died in 1888. Friedrich Wilhelm now became Emperor Fredrich III until he died only 99 days later, and Princess Victoria became Empress of Germany. Her son became Emperor Wilhelm II and forced Bismarck to retire two years later.

Wilhelm II (1888–1918) 

Wilhelm, the grandson of Queen Victoria, had a love-hate relationship with Britain. He visited it often and was well known in its higher circles, but he recklessly promoted the great expansion of the Imperial German Navy, which was a potential threat that the British government could not overlook. A humiliating crisis came in the Daily Telegraph Affair of 1908. While on an extended visit to Britain, the Kaiser gave a long interview to the Daily Telegraph that was full of bombast, exaggeration and vehement protestations of love for Britain. He ridiculed the British populace as "mad, mad as March hares" for questioning the peaceful intentions of Germany and its sincere desire for peace with England, but he admitted that the German populace was "not friendly" toward England. The interview caused a sensation around Europe, demonstrating the Kaiser was utterly incompetent in diplomatic affairs. The British had already decided that Wilhelm was at least somewhat mentally disturbed and saw the interview as further evidence of his unstable personality, rather than an indication of official German hostility. The affair was much more serious in Germany, where he was nearly unanimously ridiculed. He thereafter played mostly a ceremonial role in major state affairs.

The British Royal family retained the German surname von Sachsen-Coburg-Gotha until 1917, when, in response to anti-German feelings during World War I, it was legally changed to the more British name House of Windsor. In the same year, all members of the British Royal Family gave up their German titles, and all German relatives who were fighting against the British in the war were stripped of their British titles by the Titles Deprivation Act 1917.

Intellectual influences 
Ideas flowed back and forth between the two nations. Refugees from Germany's repressive regimes often settled in Britain, most notably Karl Marx and Friedrich Engels. Advances in technology were shared, as in chemistry. Over 100,000 German immigrants also came to Britain. Germany was perhaps one of the world's main centres for innovative social ideas in the late 19th and the early 20th centuries. The British Liberal welfare reforms, around 1910, led by the Liberals H. H. Asquith and David Lloyd George, adopted Bismarck's system of social welfare. Ideas on town planning were also exchanged.

Diplomacy 

The British Foreign Office at first was poorly served by a series of ambassadors who provided only superficial reports on the dramatic internal German developments of the 1860s. That changed with the appointment of Odo Russell (1871–1884), who developed a close rapport with Bismarck and provided in depth coverage of German developments.

Britain gave passive support to the unification under Prussian domination for strategic, ideological and business reasons. The German Empire was considered a useful counterbalance on the Continent to both France and Russia, the two powers that worried Britain the most. The threat from France in the Mediterranean and from Russia in Central Asia could be neutralised by a judicious relationship with Germany. The new nation would be a stabilising force, and Bismarck especially promoted his role in stabilising Europe and in preventing any major war on the continent. British Prime Minister William Ewart Gladstone, however, was always suspicious of Germany, disliked its authoritarianism and feared that it would eventually start a war with a weaker neighbour. The ideological gulf was stressed by Lord Arthur Russell in 1872:
Prussia now represents all that is most antagonistic to the liberal and democratic ideas of the age; military despotism, the rule of the sword, contempt for sentimental talk, indifference to human suffering, imprisonment of independent opinion, transfer by force of unwilling populations to a hateful yoke, disregard of European opinion, total want of greatness and generosity, etc., etc."

Britain was looking inward and avoided picking any disputes with Germany but made it clear, in the "war in sight" crisis of 1875, that it would not tolerate a pre-emptive war by Germany on France.

Colonies 
Bismarck built a complex network of European alliances that kept the peace in the 1870s and 1880s. The British were building up their empire, but Bismarck strongly opposed colonies as too expensive. When public opinion and elite demand finally made him, in the 1880s, grab colonies in Africa and the Pacific, he ensured that conflicts with Britain were minimal.

Improvement and worsening of relations
Relations between Britain and Germany improved as the key policymakers, Prime Minister Lord Salisbury and Chancellor Bismarck, were both realistic conservatives and largely both agreed on policies. There were even several proposals for a formal treaty relationship between Germany and Britain, but they went nowhere, as Britain preferred to stand in what it called "splendid isolation." Nevertheless, a series of developments steadily improved their relations down to 1890, when Bismarck was pushed out by the aggressive Wilhelm II. Coming to power in 1888, the young Wilhelm dismissed Bismarck in 1890 and sought aggressively to increase Germany's influence in the world. Foreign policy was controlled by the erratic Kaiser, who played an increasingly-reckless hand and by the leadership of Friedrich von Holstein, a powerful civil servant in the Foreign Office. Wilhelm argued that a long-term coalition between France and Russia had to fall apart, Russia and Britain would never get together and Britain would eventually seek an alliance with Germany. Russia could not get Germany to renew its mutual treaties and so formed a closer relationship with France in the 1894 Franco-Russian Alliance since both were worried about German aggression.  Britain refused to agree to the formal alliance that Germany sought.  Since Germany's analysis was mistaken on every point, the nation was increasingly dependent on the Triple Alliance with Austria-Hungary and Italy. That was undermined by the ethnic diversity of Austria-Hungary and its differences with Italy. The latter, in 1915, would switch sides.

In January 1896 Wilhelm escalated tensions with his Kruger telegram, congratulating Boer President Kruger of the Transvaal for beating off the Jameson raid. German officials in Berlin had managed to stop the Kaiser from proposing a German protectorate over the Transvaal. In the Second Boer War, Germany sympathised with the Boers.

German Foreign Minister Bernhard von Bülow called for Weltpolitik (World politics). It was the new policy to assert its claim to be a global power. Bismarck's conservativism was abandoned, as Germany was intent on challenging and upsetting international order. Thereafter relations deteriorated steadily. Britain began to see Germany as a hostile force and moved to friendlier relationships with France.

Naval race

The Royal Navy dominated the globe in the 19th century, but after 1890, Germany attempted to achieve parity. The resulting naval race heightened tensions between the two nations.  In 1897 Admiral Tirpitz became German Naval Secretary of State and began the transformation of German Navy from small, coastal defence force to a fleet that was meant to challenge British naval power. Tirpitz calls for Risikoflotte (Risk Fleet) that would make it too risky for Britain to take on Germany, as part of a wider bid to alter the international balance of power decisively in Germany's favour.

The German Navy, under Tirpitz, had ambitions to rival the great British Navy and dramatically expanded its fleet in the early 20th century to protect the colonies and to exert power worldwide. Tirpitz started a programme of warship construction in 1898. In 1890, to protect its new fleet. Germany traded the strategic island of Heligoland in the North Sea with Britain. In exchange, Britain gained the Eastern African island of Zanzibar, where it proceeded to construct a naval base. The British, however, were always well ahead in the naval race and introduced the highly advanced Dreadnought battleship in 1907.

Two Moroccan crises
In the First Moroccan Crisis of 1905, there was nearly war between Germany against Britain and France over a French attempt to establish a protectorate over Morocco. The Germans were upset at not being informed. Wilhelm made a highly provocative speech for Moroccan independence. The following year, a conference was held at Algeciras in which all of the European powers except Austria-Hungary (now increasingly seen as little more than a German satellite) sided with France. A compromise was brokered by the United States for the French to relinquish some of their control over Morocco.

In 1911, France prepared to send more troops into Morocco. German Foreign Minister Alfred von Kiderlen-Waechter was not opposed to that if Germany had compensation elsewhere in Africa, in the French Congo. He sent a small warship, the SMS Panther, to Agadir, made saber-rattling threats and whipped up anger by German nationalists. France and Germany soon agreed on a compromise, with France gaining control of Morocco and Germany gaining some of the French Congo. The British cabinet, however, was angry and alarmed at Germany's aggression. Lloyd George made a dramatic "Mansion House" speech that denounced the German move as an intolerable humiliation. There was talk of war until Germany backed down, and relations remained sour.

Start of World War I

The Liberal Party controlled the British government in 1914 and was averse to war with anyone and wanted to remain neutral as the First World War suddenly erupted in July 1914. Since relations with Germany regarding colonies and the naval race had improved in 1914 it did not expect trouble. However Liberal Prime Minister H.H. Asquith and especially Foreign Minister Edward Grey were committed to defending France, which was weaker than Germany. The Conservative Party was very hostile to Germany as a threat both to Britain and to France. The emerging Labour Party and other socialists denounced the war as a capitalist device to maximize profits.

In 1907, the leading German expert in the Foreign Office, Eyre Crowe, wrote a memorandum for senior officials that warned vigorously against German intentions. Crowe argued that Berlin wanted "hegemony... in Europe, and eventually in the world". Crowe argued that Germany presented a threat to the balance of power as that of Napoleon. Germany would expand its power unless the 1904 Entente Cordiale with France was upgraded to a full military alliance. Crowe was taken seriously, especially because he was born in Germany.

In Germany, left-wing parties, especially the SPD or Socialist Party, in the 1912 German election, won a third of the vote and the most seats for the first time. German historian Fritz Fischer famously argued that the Junkers, who dominated Germany, wanted an external war to distract the population and to whip up patriotic support for the government. Other scholars, like Niall Ferguson, think that German conservatives were ambivalent about war and that they worried that losing a war would have disastrous consequences and that even a successful war might alienate the population if it was long or difficult.

In explaining why neutral Britain went to war with Germany, Paul Kennedy, in The Rise of the Anglo-German Antagonism, 1860–1914 (1980), argued Germany had become economically more powerful than Britain. Kennedy downplayed the disputes over economic trade and imperialism. There had long been disputes over the Baghdad Railway which Germany proposed to build through the Ottoman Empire. An amicable compromise on the railway was reached in early 1914 so it played no role in starting the July Crisis. Germany relied upon time and again on sheer military power, but Britain began to appeal to moral sensibilities. Germany saw its invasion of Belgium as a necessary military tactic, and Britain saw it as a profound moral crime, a major cause of British entry into the war. Kennedy argues that by far the main reason for the war was London's fear that a repeat of 1870, when Prussia led other German states to smash France, would mean Germany, with a powerful army and navy, would control the English Channel and northwestern France. British policymakers thought that would be a catastrophe for British security.

In 1839, Britain, Prussia, France, and the Netherlands agreed to the Treaty of London that guaranteed the neutrality of Belgium. Germany violated that treaty in 1914, with its chancellor Theobald von Bethmann Hollweg ridiculing the treaty a "scrap of paper". That ensured that Liberals would join Conservatives in calling for war.  Historian Zara Steiner says that in response to the German invasion of Belgium: 
The public mood did change. Belgium proved to be a catalyst which unleashed the many emotions, rationalizations, and glorifications of war which had long been part of the British climate of opinion. Having a moral cause, all the latent anti-German feelings, that by years of naval rivalry and assumed enmity, rose to the surface. The 'scrap of paper' proved decisive both in maintaining the unity of the government and then in providing a focal point for public feeling.

Allied victory
The great German offensive on the Western Front in spring 1918 almost succeeded. The Germans broke through into open country but outran their supplies and artillery support. By summer 1918, American soldiers were arriving on the front at 10,000 a day, but Germany was unable to replace its casualties and its army shrank every day. A series of huge battles in September and October produced sweeping Allied victories, and the German High Command, under Field Marshal Paul von Hindenburg, saw it had lost and told Wilhelm to abdicate and go into exile.

In November, the new republic negotiated an armistice, hoping to obtain lenient terms based on the Fourteen Points of US President Woodrow Wilson. Instead, the terms amounted almost to a surrender: Allied forces occupied Germany up the River Rhine, and Germany was required to disarm, losing its war gains, colonies and navy. By keeping the food blockade in place, the Allies were determined to starve Germany until it agreed to peace terms.

In the 1918 election, only days later, British Prime Minister Lloyd George promised to impose a harsh treaty on Germany. At the Paris Peace Conference in early 1919, however, Lloyd George was much more moderate than France and Italy, but he still agreed to force Germany to admit starting the war and to commit to paying the entire cost of the Allies in the war, including veterans' benefits and interest.

Interwar
From 1920 to 1933, Britain and Germany were on generally good terms, as shown by the Locarno Treaties and the Kellogg–Briand Pact, which helped reintegrate Germany into Europe.

At the 1922 Genoa Conference, Britain clashed openly with France over the amount of reparations to be collected from Germany. In 1923, France occupied the Ruhr industrial area of Germany after Germany defaulted in its reparations. Britain condemned the French move and largely supported Germany in the Ruhrkampf (Ruhr Struggle) between the Germans and the French. In 1924, Britain forced France to make major reductions on the number of reparations Germany had to pay.

The US later resolved the reparations issue. The Dawes Plan (1924–1929) and the Young Plan (1929–1931), sponsored by the US, provided financing for the sums that Germany owed the Allies in reparations. Much of the money returned to Britain, which then paid off its American loans. From 1931, German payments to Britain were suspended. Eventually, in 1951, West Germany would pay off the World War I reparations that it owed to Britain.

With the coming to power of Hitler and the Nazis in 1933, relations worsened. In 1934, a secret report by the British Defence Requirements Committee called Germany the "ultimate potential enemy against whom all our "long range" defence policy must be directed," and called for an expeditionary force of five mechanised divisions and fourteen infantry divisions. However, budget restraints prevented the formation of a large force.

In 1935, the two nations agreed to the Anglo-German Naval Agreement to avoid a repeat of the pre-1914 naval race.

By 1936, appeasement was British effort to prevent war or at least to postpone it until the British military was ready. Appeasement has been the subject of intense debate for 70 years by academics, politicians and diplomats. Historians' assessments have ranged from condemnation for allowing Hitler's Germany to grow too strong to the judgement that it was in Britain's best interests and that there was no alternative.

At the time, the concessions were very popular, especially the Munich Agreement in 1938 of Germany, Britain, France and Italy.

World War II
 
Germany and Britain fought each other from the British declaration of war, in September 1939, to the German surrender, in May 1945. The war continues to loom large in the British public memory.

At the beginning of the war, Germany crushed Poland. In spring 1940, Germany astonished the world by quickly invading the Low Countries and France, driving the British army off the Continent and seizing most of its weapons, vehicles and supplies. War was brought to the British skies in the Battle of Britain in late summer 1940, but the aerial assault was repulsed, which stopped Operation Sealion, the plans for the invasion of Britain.

The British Empire was standing alone against Germany, but the United States greatly funded and supplied the British. In December 1941, United States entered the war against Germany and Japan after the attack on Pearl Harbor by Japan, which also later overwhelmed British outposts in the Pacific from Hong Kong to Singapore.

The Allied invasion of France on D-Day in June 1944 as well as strategic bombing and land forces all contributed to the final defeat of Germany.

Since 1945

Occupation
As part of the Yalta and Potsdam agreements, Britain took control of its own sector in occupied Germany. It soon merged its sector with the American and French sectors, and that territory became the independent nation of West Germany in 1949.  The British played a central role in the Nuremberg trials of major war criminals in 1946.  In Berlin, the British, American, and French zones were joined into West Berlin, and the four occupying powers kept official control of the city until 1991.

Much of Germany's industrial plant fell within the British zone and there was trepidation that rebuilding the old enemy's industrial powerhouse would eventually prove a danger to British security and compete with the battered British economy. One solution was to build up a strong, free trade union movement in Germany. Another was to rely primarily on American money, through the Marshall Plan, that modernised both the British and German economies, and reduced traditional barriers to trade and efficiency. It was Washington, not London, that pushed Germany and France to reconcile and join in the Schumann Plan of 1950 by which they agreed to pool their coal and steel industries.

Cold War
With the United States taking the lead, Britain with its Royal Air Force played a major supporting role in providing food and coal to Berlin in the Berlin airlift of 1948–1949. The airlift broke the Soviet blockade which was designed to force the Western Allies out of the city.

In 1955, West Germany joined NATO, while East Germany joined the Warsaw Pact. Britain at this point did not officially recognise East Germany.  However the left wing of the Labour Party, breaking with the anti-communism of the postwar years, called for its recognition.  This call heightened tensions between the British Labour Party and the German Social Democratic Party (SPD).

After 1955, Britain decided to rely on relatively inexpensive nuclear weapons as a deterrent against the Soviet Union, and a way to reduce its very expensive troop commitments in West Germany.  London gained support from Washington and went ahead with the reductions while insisting it was maintaining its commitment to the defence of Western Europe.

Britain made two applications for membership in the Common Market (European Community). It failed in the face of the French veto in 1961, but its reapplication in 1967 was eventually successful, with negotiations being concluded in 1972. The diplomatic support of West Germany proved decisive.

In 1962, Britain secretly assured Poland of its acceptance of the latter's western boundary. West Germany had been ambiguous about the matter. Britain had long been uneasy with West Germany's insistence on the provisional nature of the boundary. On the other hand, it was kept secret so as not to antagonise Britain's key ally in its quest to enter the European Community.

In 1970, West German government under the Chancellor Willy Brandt, the former mayor of West Berlin, signed a treaty with Poland recognizing and guaranteeing the borders of Poland.

Reunification

In 1990, United Kingdom prime minister Margaret Thatcher at first opposed German reunification but eventually accepted the Treaty on the Final Settlement with Respect to Germany.

Since 1945, Germany hosts several British military installations in Western part of the country as part of British Forces Germany. Both countries are members of NATO, and share strong economic ties. 
David McAllister, the former minister-president of the German state of Lower Saxony, son of a Scottish father and a German mother, holds British and German citizenship. Similarly, the former leader of the Scottish National Party in the British House of Commons, Angus Robertson is half German, as his mother was from Germany. Robertson speaks fluent German and English.

In 1996, Britain and Germany established a shared embassy building in Reykjavik. Celebrations to open the building were held on 2 June 1996 and attended by the British Foreign Secretary at the time, Malcolm Rifkind, and the then Minister of State at the German Foreign Ministry, Werner Hoyer, and the Icelandic Foreign Minister Halldór Ásgrímsson. The commemorative plaque in the building records that it is "the first purpose built co-located British-German chancery building in Europe".

Twinnings

  Aberdeen, Aberdeenshire and  Regensburg, Bavaria
  Aberystwyth, Ceredigion and  Kronberg im Taunus, Hesse
  Abingdon, Oxfordshire and  Schongau, Bavaria
  Amersham, Buckinghamshire and  Bensheim, Hesse
  Ashford, Kent and  Bad Münstereifel, North Rhine-Westphalia
  Barking and Dagenham, London and  Witten, North Rhine-Westphalia
  Barnet, London and  Tempelhof-Schöneberg, Berlin
  Barnsley, South Yorkshire and  Schwäbisch Gmünd, Baden-Württemberg
  Basingstoke, Hampshire and  Euskirchen, North Rhine-Westphalia
  Bath, Somerset and  Braunschweig, Lower Saxony
  Bedford, Bedfordshire and  Bamberg, Bavaria
  Belfast and  Bonn, North Rhine Westphalia
  Beverley, East Riding of Yorkshire and  Lemgo, North Rhine Westphalia
  Birmingham and  Frankfurt, Hesse
  Blackpool and  Bottrop, North Rhine-Westphalia
  Blyth, Northumberland and  Solingen, North Rhine-Westphalia
  Bolton, Greater Manchester and  Paderborn, North Rhine-Westphalia
  Bracknell, Berkshire and  Leverkusen, North Rhine-Westphalia
  Brentwood, Essex and  Roth bei Nürnberg, Bavaria
  Bristol and  Hanover, Lower Saxony
  Bromley, London and  Neuwied, Rhineland-Palatinate
  Cambridge, Cambridgeshire and  Heidelberg, Baden-Württemberg
  Cannock, Staffordshire and  Datteln, Baden-Württemberg
  Cardiff, South Glamorgan and  Stuttgart, Baden-Württemberg
  Carlisle, Cumbria and  Flensburg, Schleswig-Holstein
  Chelmsford, Essex and  Backnang, Baden-Württemberg
  Cheltenham, Gloucestershire and  Trier, Moselle
  Chesham, Buckinghamshire and  Friedrichsdorf, Hesse
  Chester, Cheshire and  Lörrach, Baden-Württemberg
  Chesterfield, Derbyshire and  Darmstadt, Hesse
  Christchurch, Dorset and  Aalen, Baden-Württemberg
  Cirencester, Gloucestershire and  Itzehoe, Schleswig-Holstein
  Cleethorpes, North East Lincolnshire and  Königswinter, North Rhine-Westphalia
  Colchester, Essex and  Wetzlar, Hesse
  Coventry, West Midlands and  Dresden, Saxony, and Kiel, Schleswig-Holstein
  Crawley, West Sussex and  Dorsten, North Rhine-Westphalia
  Darlington, County Durham and  Mülheim an der Ruhr, North Rhine-Westphalia
  Derby, Derbyshire and  Osnabrück, Lower Saxony
  Devizes, Wiltshire and  Waiblingen, Baden-Württemberg
  Dronfield, Derbyshire and  Sindelfingen, Baden-Württemberg
  Dundee and  Würzburg, Bavaria
  Dunfermline and  Wilhelmshaven, Lower Saxony
  Durham and  Tübingen, Baden-Württemberg
  Ealing, London and  Steinfurt, North Rhine-Westphalia
  Edinburgh and  Munich, Bavaria
  Elgin, Moray and  Landshut, Bavaria
  Ellesmere Port, Cheshire and  Reutlingen, Baden-Württemberg
  Enniskillen, County Fermanagh and  Brackwede, Bielefeld, North Rhine-Westphalia
  Epping, Essex and  Eppingen, Baden-Württemberg
  Exeter, Devon and  Bad Homburg vor der Höhe, Hesse
  Fareham, Hampshire and  Pulheim, North Rhine-Westphalia
  Felixstowe, Suffolk and  Wesel, North Rhine-Westphalia
  Glasgow and  Nuremberg, Bavaria
  Glossop, Derbyshire and  Bad Vilbel, Hesse
  Gloucester, Gloucestershire and  Trier, Rhineland-Palatinate
  Grantham, Lincolnshire and  Sankt Augustin, North Rhine-Westphalia
  Greenwich, London and  Reinickendorf, Berlin
  Guildford, Surrey and  Freiburg im Breisgau, Baden-Württemberg
  Halifax, West Yorkshire and  Aachen, North Rhine-Westphalia
  Hammersmith and Fulham, London and  Neukölln, Berlin
  Hartlepool, County Durham and  Hückelhoven, North Rhine-Westphalia
  Havering, London and  Ludwigshafen am Rhein, Rhineland-Palatinate
  Hemel Hempstead and Dacorum, Hertfordshire and  Neu Isenburg, Hesse
  Hereford, Herefordshire and  Dillenburg, Hesse
  Herne Bay, Kent and  Waltrop, North Rhine-Westphalia
  High Wycombe, Buckinghamshire and  Kelkheim, Hesse
  Hillingdon, London and  Schleswig, Schleswig-Holstein
  Hinckley, Leicestershire and  Herford, North Rhine-Westphalia
  Hitchin, Hertfordshire and  Bingen am Rhein, Rhineland-Palatinate
  Hurst Green, East Sussex and  Ellerhoop, Schleswig-Holstein
  Inverness, Scotland and  Augsburg, Bavaria
  Kendal, Cumbria and  Rinteln, Lower Saxony
  Kettering, Northamptonshire and  Lahnstein, Rhineland-Palatinate
  Kidderminster, Worcestershire and  Husum, Schleswig-Holstein
  Kilmarnock, Ayrshire and  Kulmbach, Bavaria
  King's Lynn, Norfolk and  Emmerich am Rhein, North Rhine-Westphalia
  Kirkcaldy, Fife and  Ingolstadt, Bavaria
  Knaresborough, North Yorkshire and  Bebra, Hesse
  Lancaster, Lancashire and  Rendsburg, Schleswig-Holstein
  Leeds, West Yorkshire and  Dortmund, North Rhine-Westphalia
  Leicester, Leicestershire and  Krefeld, North Rhine-Westphalia
  Leven, Fife and  Holzminden, Lower Saxony
  Lewisham, London and  Charlottenburg-Wilmersdorf, Berlin
  Lichfield, Staffordshire and  Limburg an der Lahn, Hesse
  Lincoln, Lincolnshire and  Neustadt an der Weinstraße, Rhineland-Palatinate
  Littlehampton, West Sussex and  Durmersheim, Baden-Württemberg
  Liverpool and  Cologne, North Rhine-Westphalia
  London and  Berlin
  Loughborough and  Schwäbisch Hall
  Luton, Bedfordshire and  Bergisch Gladbach, North Rhine-Westphalia
  Maidenhead, Berkshire and  Bad Godesberg, North Rhine-Westphalia
  Manchester and  Chemnitz, Saxony
  Margate, Kent and  Idar-Oberstein, Rhineland-Palatinate
  Middlesbrough, North Yorkshire and  Oberhausen, North Rhine-Westphalia
  Milton Keynes, Buckinghamshire and  Bernkastel-Kues, Rhineland-Palatinate
  Morley, West Yorkshire and  Siegen, North Rhine-Westphalia
  Motherwell, Lanarkshire and  Schweinfurt, Bavaria
  Newcastle upon Tyne, Tyne and Wear and  Gelsenkirchen, North Rhine-Westphalia
  Northampton, Northamptonshire and Marburg, Hesse
  Norwich, Norfolk and  Koblenz, Rhineland-Palatinate
  Nottingham, Nottinghamshire and  Karlsruhe, Baden-Württemberg
  Nuneaton and Bedworth, Warwickshire and  Cottbus, Brandenburg
  Oakham, Rutland and  Barmstedt, Schleswig-Holstein
  Oxford, Oxfordshire and  Bonn, North Rhine-Westphalia
  Paisley, Renfrewshire and  Fürth, Bavaria
  Perth, Perth and Kinross and  Aschaffenburg, Bavaria
  Peterlee, County Durham and  Nordenham, Lower Saxony
  Portsmouth, Hampshire and  Duisburg, North Rhine-Westphalia
  Potton, Bedfordshire and  Langenlonsheim, Rhineland-Palatinate
  Preston, Lancashire and  Recklinghausen, North Rhine-Westphalia
  Prestwick, South Ayrshire and  Lichtenfels, Bavaria
  Reading, Berkshire and  Düsseldorf, North Rhine-Westphalia
  Redcar and Cleveland, North Yorkshire and  Troisdorf, North Rhine-Westphalia 
  Reigate, Surrey and  Eschweiler, North Rhine-Westphalia
  Richmond upon Thames, London and  Konstanz, Baden-Württemberg
  Rossendale, Lancashire and  Bocholt, North Rhine-Westphalia
  Royal Tunbridge Wells, Kent and  Wiesbaden, Hesse
  Borough of Runnymede, Surrey and  Bergisch Gladbach, North Rhine-Westphalia
  Rushmoor, Hampshire and  Oberursel, Hesse
  Sheffield, South Yorkshire and  Bochum, North Rhine-Westphalia
  Skipton, North Yorkshire and  Simbach am Inn, Bavaria
  Solihull, West Midlands and  Main-Taunus-Kreis, Hesse
  South Tyneside, Tyne and Wear and  Wuppertal, North Rhine-Westphalia
  Spalding, Lincolnshire and  Speyer, Rhineland-Palatinate
  St Albans, Hertfordshire and  Worms, Rhineland-Palatinate
  St. Helens, Merseyside and  Stuttgart, Baden-Württemberg
  Stafford, Staffordshire and  Dreieich, Hesse
  Stevenage, Hertfordshire and  Ingelheim am Rhein, Bielefeld, Rhineland-Palatinate
  Stockport, Greater Manchester and  Heilbronn, Baden-Württemberg
  Stoke-on-Trent, Staffordshire and  Erlangen, Bavaria
  Sunderland, Tyne and Wear and  Essen, North Rhine-Westphalia
  Sutton, London and  Charlottenburg-Wilmersdorf, Berlin, and Minden, North Rhine-Westphalia
  Swansea, West Glamorgan and  Mannheim, Baden-Württemberg
  Todmorden, West Yorkshire and  Bramsche, Lower Saxony
  Torbay, Devon and  Hamelin, Lower Saxony
  Thurso, Caithness and  Brilon, North Rhine-Westphalia
  Truro, Cornwall and  Boppard, North Rhine-Westphalia
  Uckfield, East Sussex and  Quickborn, Pinneberg, Schleswig-Holstein
  Wallingford, Oxfordshire and  Bad Wurzach, Baden-Württemberg
  Waltham Forest, London and  Wandsbek, Hamburg
  Wantage, Oxfordshire and  Seesen, Lower Saxony
  Ware, Hertfordshire and  Wülfrath, North Rhine-Westphalia
  Warwick, Warwickshire and  Verden (Aller), Lower Saxony
  Waverley, Surrey and  Mayen-Koblenz, Rhineland-Palatinate
  Waterlooville, Hampshire and  Henstedt-Ulzburg, Schleswig-Holstein
  Watford, Hertfordshire and  Mainz, Rhineland-Palatinate
  Wellingborough, Northamptonshire and  Wittlich, Rhineland-Palatinate
  Weston-super-Mare, North Somerset and  Hildesheim, Lower Saxony
  Weymouth, Dorset and  Holzwickede, North Rhine-Westphalia
  Whitstable, Kent and  Borken, North Rhine-Westphalia
  Isle of Wight and  Coburg, Bavaria
  Windsor, Berkshire and  Goslar, Lower Saxony
  Witney, Oxfordshire and  Unterhaching, Bavaria
  Woking, Surrey and  Rastatt, Baden-Württemberg
  Wokingham, Berkshire and  Erftstadt, North Rhine-Westphalia
  Worcester, Worcestershire and  Kleve, North Rhine-Westphalia
  Workington, Cumbria and  Selm, North Rhine-Westphalia
  York, North Yorkshire and  Münster', North Rhine-Westphalia

See also
 
 Foreign relations of Germany
 Foreign relations of the United Kingdom
 Anglo-German naval arms race
 Causes of World War I
 German entry into World War I
 History of German foreign policy
 International relations of the Great Powers (1814–1919)
 Timeline of British diplomatic history
 Anglo-German Fellowship
 Anglo-Prussian alliance
 Centre for Anglo-German Cultural Relations
 British Forces Germany
 Two World Wars and One World Cup
 England–Germany football rivalry
 British migration to Germany 
 Germans in the United Kingdom

References

Further reading

 Adams, R. J. Q. British Politics and Foreign Policy in the Age of Appeasement, 1935–1939 (1993)
 Albrecht-Carrie, Rene. A Diplomatic History of Europe since the Congress of Vienna (1958), passim online
 Anderson, Pauline Relyea. The background of anti-English feeling in Germany, 1890–1902 (1939). online
 Aydelotte, William Osgood. "The First German Colony and Its Diplomatic Consequences." Cambridge Historical Journal 5#3 (1937): 291–313. online, South-West Africa
 Bartlett, C. J. British Foreign Policy in the Twentieth Century (1989)
 Brandenburg, Erich. From Bismarck to the World War: A History of German Foreign Policy 1870–1914  (1928) online
 Carroll, E. Malcolm. Germany and the great powers, 1866–1914 : a study in public opinion and foreign policy (1938), 855pp; highly detailed diplomatic history
 Dunn, J.S.  The Crowe Memorandum: Sir Eyre Crowe and Foreign Office Perceptions of Germany, 1918–1925 (2012). excerpt , on British policy toward Germany
 Faber, David. Munich, 1938: Appeasement and World War II (2009) excerpt and text search
 Frederick, Suzanne Y. "The Anglo-German Rivalry, 1890–1914," pp 306–336 in William R. Thompson, ed. Great power rivalries (1999) online
 Geppert, Dominik, and Robert Gerwarth, eds. Wilhelmine Germany and Edwardian Britain: Essays on Cultural Affinity (2009)
 Gifford, Prosser and William Roger Louis. Britain and Germany in Africa: Imperial rivalry and colonial rule (1967).
 Görtemaker, Manfred. Britain and Germany in the Twentieth Century (2005).
 Hale, Oron James. Publicity and Diplomacy: With special reference to England and Germany, 1890–1914 (1940)  online.
 Harris, David. "Bismarck's Advance to England, January, 1876." Journal of Modern History 3.3 1931): 441–456. online
 Hilderbrand, Klaus. German Foreign Policy from Bismarck to Adenauer (1989; reprint 2013), 272pp
 Hoerber, Thomas. "Prevail or perish: Anglo-German naval competition at the beginning of the twentieth century," European Security (2011) 20#1, pp. 65–79.
 Horn, David Bayne. Great Britain and Europe in the eighteenth century (1967) covers 1603–1702; pp 144–77 for Prussia; pp 178–200 for other Germany; 111-43 for Austria
Kennedy, Paul M. "Idealists and realists: British views of Germany, 1864–1939," Transactions of the Royal Historical Society 25 (1975) pp: 137–56; compares the views of idealists (pro-German) and realists (anti-German)
 Kennedy, Paul. The Rise of the Anglo-German Antagonism 1860–1914 (London, 1980) excerpt and text search; influential synthesis; 600pp
 Kennedy, Paul. The Rise and Fall of the Great Powers (1987), pp 194–260. online free to borrow
 Kennedy, Paul. The Rise and Fall of British Naval mastery (1976) pp 205–38.
 Kennedy, Paul M. "Idealists and realists: British views of Germany, 1864–1939." Transactions of the Royal Historical Society 25 (1975): 137–156.  online
 Lambi, I. The navy and German power politics, 1862–1914 (1984).
 Langer William L.  European Alliances and Alignments: 1871–1890 (2nd ed. 1956) online
 Langer William L. The Diplomacy Of Imperialism (1890–1902) (1960) online
 Major, Patrick. "Britain and Germany: A Love-Hate Relationship?" German History, October 2008, Vol. 26 Issue 4, pp. 457–468.
 Massie, Robert K. Dreadnought: Britain, Germany and the Coming of the Great War (1991); popular history
 Milton, Richard. Best of Enemies: Britain and Germany: 100 Years of Truth and Lies (2004), popular history covers 1845–1945 focusing on public opinion and propaganda; 368pp excerpt and text search
 Mowat, R.B. A History Of European Diplomacy 1914–1925 (1927) online
 Neilson, Francis. "Bismarck's Relations With England." American Journal of Economics and Sociology 9.3 (1950): 293–306. online
Neville P. Hitler and Appeasement: The British Attempt to Prevent the Second World War (2005).
 Oltermann, Philip. Keeping Up With the Germans: A History of Anglo-German Encounters (2012)  excerpt; explores historical encounters between prominent Britons and Germans to show the contrasting approaches to topics from language and politics to sex and sport.
 Otte, Thomas G. "'The Winston of Germany': The British Foreign Policy Élite and the Last German Emperor." Canadian Journal of History 36.3 (2001): 471–504. Negative views on Kaiser Wilhelm's mental stability.
 Padfield, Peter The Great Naval Race: Anglo-German Naval Rivalry 1900–1914 (2005)
 Palmer, Alan. Crowned Cousins: The Anglo-German Royal Connection (London, 1985).
 Ramsden, John. Don’t Mention the War: The British and the Germans since 1890 (London, 2006).
 Reinermann, Lothar. "Fleet Street and the Kaiser: British public opinion and Wilhelm II." German History 26.4 (2008): 469–485.
 Reynolds, David.  Britannia Overruled: British Policy and World Power in the Twentieth Century (2nd ed. 2000)  excerpt and text search, major survey of British foreign policy
 Rich, Norman. Great Power Diplomacy, 1814–1914 (1992), passim.
 Rüger, Jan. The Great Naval Game: Britain and Germany in the Age of Empire (Cambridge, 2007).
 Rüger, Jan. "Revisiting the Anglo-German Antagonism," Journal of Modern History (2011) 83#3, pp. 579–617 in JSTOR
 Schmitt, Bernadotte E. England and Germany, 1740–1914 (1918) online.
 Scully, Richard. British Images of Germany: Admiration, Antagonism, and Ambivalence, 1860–1914 (Palgrave Macmillan, 2012) 375pp
 Seton-Watson, R. W. Britain in Europe, 1789–1914. (1938); comprehensive history online
 Sontag, Raymond James. Germany and England: background of conflict, 1848–1898 (1938) online free to borrow
 Sontag, Raymond James. European Diplomatic History 1871–1932 (1933) online
 Taylor, A. J. P. Struggle for Mastery of Europe: 1848–1918 (1954), comprehensive survey of diplomacy
 Urbach, Karina. Bismarck's Favourite Englishman: Lord Odo Russell's Mission to Berlin (1999)  excerpt and text search
 Weinberg, Gerhard L. The Foreign Policy of Hitler's Germany (2 vols. (1980)
  Willis, Edward F. Prince Lichnowsky, ambassador of peace; a study of prewar diplomacy, 1912–1914 (1942) online

 Primary sources 
 Dugdale, E.T.S. ed German Diplomatic Documents 1871–1914 (4 vol 1928–31), English translation of major German diplomatic documents vol 1, primary sources, Germany and Britain 1870–1890. vol 2 1890s online
 Gooch, G. P., and Harold Temperley, eds. British Documents on the Origins of the War, Vol. 6: Anglo-German Tension: Armaments and Negotiation, 1907–12 (1930) pp 666–761. online
 Temperley, Harold and L.M. Penson, eds. Foundations of British Foreign Policy: From Pitt (1792) to Salisbury (1902)  (1938) online, 608pp of primary sources

Post 1941
 Bark, Dennis L., and David R. Gress. A History of West Germany. Vol. 1: From Shadow to Substance, 1945–1963. Vol. 2: Democracy and Its Discontents, 1963–1991 (1993), the standard scholarly history
 Berger, Stefan, and Norman LaPorte, eds. The Other Germany: Perceptions and Influences in British-East German Relations, 1945–1990 (Augsburg, 2005).
 Berger, Stefan, and Norman LaPorte, eds. Friendly Enemies: Britain and the GDR, 1949–1990 (2010) online review
 Deighton, Anne.  The Impossible Peace: Britain, the Division of Germany and the Origins of the Cold War (Oxford, 1993)
  Dockrill, Saki. Britain's Policy for West German Rearmament, 1950–1955 (1991) 209pp
 Glees, Anthony. The Stasi files: East Germany's secret operations against Britain (2004)
  Hanrieder, Wolfram F.  Germany, America, Europe: Forty Years of German Foreign Policy (1991) 
 Heuser, Beatrice. NATO, Britain, France & the FRG: Nuclear Strategies & Forces for Europe, 1949–2000 (1997) 256pp
 Noakes, Jeremy et al. Britain and Germany in Europe, 1949–1990 * Macintyre, Terry. Anglo-German Relations during the Labour Governments, 1964–70: NATO Strategy, Détente and European Integration (2008)
 Mawby, Spencer. Containing Germany: Britain & the Arming of the Federal Republic (1999), p. 1. 244p. 
 Smith, Gordon et al.  Developments in German Politics (1992), pp. 137–86, on foreign policy
 Turner, Ian D., ed. Reconstruction in Postwar Germany: British Occupation Policy and the Western Zones, 1945–1955 (Oxford, 1992), 421pp.
 Zimmermann, Hubert. Money and Security: Troops, Monetary Policy & West Germany's Relations with the United States and Britain, 1950–1971'' (2002) 275pp

External links
Anglo-German Relations: Paul Joyce, University of Portsmouth 
Anglo-German Club in Hamburg
Deutsch-Britische Gesellschaft in Berlin
Anglo-German Foundation
British-German Association
German-British Chamber of Industry & Commerce in London
German Industry in the UK 
UK-German Connection
British Embassy in Berlin 
German Embassy in London
Centre for Anglo-German Cultural Relations
News BBC – 'Thatcher's fight against German unity'
German Association for the Study of British History and Politics 

 
United Kingdom
Bilateral relations of the United Kingdom